Commonwealth Games Australia (CGA) is the Commonwealth Games Association for Australia, and is responsible for representing and promoting the Commonwealth Sport movement in the country, and organises the participation of athletes at the Commonwealth Games and Commonwealth Youth Games.  It changed it name from the Australian Commonwealth Games Association to Commonwealth Games Australia in 2015. The Commonwealth Games have been held in Australia five times, most recently the 2018 Commonwealth Games were held on the Gold Coast, Queensland.

Role 

The CGA is one of 72 Commonwealth Games Associations currently recognised by the Commonwealth Games Federation (CGF).

Working with the national governing bodies of each sport, Commonwealth Games Australia selects Team Australia's members to compete in all sports at the Commonwealth Games and Commonwealth Youth Games. The CGA is independent and receives no funding from the government. The non-profit organisation's income comes from fundraising and events.

Administration 
It was established in October 1929 as the Australian British Empire Games Committee with E.S. Marks as Chairman and James. S.W. Eve as Honorary Secretary. It has also known as Australian British Empire Games Association, Australian British Empire & Commonwealth Association, Australian British Commonwealth Games Association and Australian Commonwealth Games Association.

Australian British Empire Games Committee (1929-1932)

Australian British Empire Games Association (1932-1953) 

(*) died in 1947

Australian British Empire & Commonwealth Association (1953-1966)

Australian British Commonwealth Games Association (1966-1974)

Australian Commonwealth Games Association (1974-2015)

Commonwealth Games Australia (2015-)

Aims 
The main functions of the CGA are to:

 Promote the ideals of the Commonwealth Games throughout Australia;
 Prepare athletes for the Games by providing support such as funding for international competition;
 Select athletes, coaches, managers, medical personnel and officials to be included in the Australian Team at the Games;
 Coordinate and manage the participation of Program Sports and their respective athletes and officials at the Commonwealth Games;
 Contribute to the development of Australia's high performance junior athletes through the Australian Junior Commonwealth Games Squad Program (AJCGS), and through participation in the Commonwealth Youth Games.

History 

From the concept of "a British Empire Sports Festival" by the Englishman, J Astley Cooper, the idea was promoted in Australia by B J Parkinson  in Victoria and Richard Coombes in New South Wales who was President of the Amateur Athletic Union of Australia.Australia has won the medal tally at 13 Commonwealth games.

Australia first competed at the Games, then titled the British Empire Games, in 1930; and is one of only six countries to have sent athletes to every Commonwealth Games. The others are Canada, England, New Zealand, Scotland, and Wales.

Six of the 21 games have been hosted by Australia, with the city of Gold Coast hosting the 2018 Commonwealth Games.

Australia has placed first at 13 out of the 21 games (compared with England 7 and Canada 1) and has been in the top three for all meets except the first games in 1930.

In all but one of the 18 Commonwealth Games held so far (excluding the 1978 Games), the Australian flag bearer has gone on to win a gold medal.

Games Staged

Australia has hosted the Commonwealth Games on four occasions but have only won once via an international vote. That vote was for the host of the 2018 games, won by the Gold Coast.

Sydney 1938 was simply awarded.

Perth 1962 was a contest between Adelaide and Perth which Adelaide originally won at the 1956 Summer Olympics in Melbourne, Australia. Adelaide first won 13 votes to Perth's 3. Two years later that was overturned by the Australian Commonwealth Games Association prior to the 1958 British Empire Games in Cardiff, Wales. A New Vote awarded Perth with a 9 to 7 vote.

Brisbane 1982 was awarded after Lagos, Nigeria; Kuala Lumpur, Malaysia and Birmingham, England all withdrew prior to the Bid vote that took place in Montreal, Quebec, Canada during the 1976 Summer Olympics.

Melbourne 2006 was awarded to the city after Wellington, New Zealand withdrew their bid prior to the Bid Lodgement Deadline.

Failed bid Results

See also
 Australia at the Commonwealth Games
 Australian Olympic Committee
 Australian Paralympic Committee

References

External links 
 CGA Official website

Australia
Sports governing bodies in Australia
Australia at the Commonwealth Games